Celtic field is an old name for traces of early (prehistoric) agricultural field systems found in North-West Europe, i.e. Britain, Ireland, Belgium, Netherlands, Germany, Denmark, France, Sweden, Poland and the Baltic states. The fields themselves are not related to the Celtic culture.

The name was given by O. G. S. Crawford. They are sometimes preserved in areas where industrial farming has not been adopted and can date from any time from the Early Bronze Age (c. 1800 BC) until the early medieval period. They can be preserved as earthworks or soil marks.

Dorset and Wiltshire). Their small size (35–50 m; 40–55 yd) implies that each was cultivated by a single person or household.

Lynchets, evidence of early ploughing can often be seen at the upper and lower ends. Large scale Roman agriculture replaced them in lowland Britain and they are more common in less accessible regions such as the West Country.

See also
Cord rig
Run rig
Rundale
Céide Fields

References

External links
 Link now dead - air photo of a Celtic fieldsystem in Dorset
 Celtic Fields - and Celtic Farming in Britain
 Article about the Salisbury Plain which includes a picture by Crawford from 1924 of Celtic fields (about 3/4 of the way down the page)

History of agriculture in the United Kingdom
Archaeology of the United Kingdom
Iron Age Britain
Bronze Age Britain
History of the British Isles
Prehistoric agriculture